The 2017 Shanghai Challenger was a professional tennis tournament played on hard courts. It was the seventh edition of the tournament which was part of the 2017 ATP Challenger Tour. It took place in Shanghai, China between 11 and 17 September 2017.

Singles main-draw entrants

Seeds

 1 Rankings are as of 28 August 2017.

Other entrants
The following players received wildcards into the singles main draw:
  Sun Fajing
  Wang Chuhan
  Wu Yibing
  Zhang Zhizhen

The following player received entry into the singles main draw using a protected ranking:
  Bradley Klahn

The following players received entry from the qualifying draw:
  Yuya Kibi
  Bradley Mousley
  Kento Takeuchi
  Xia Zihao

Champions

Singles

  Wu Yibing def.  Lu Yen-hsun 7–6(8–6), 0–0 ret.

Doubles

 Toshihide Matsui /  Yi Chu-huan def.  Bradley Klahn /  Peter Polansky 6–7(1–7), 6–4, [10–5].

References

Shanghai Challenger
2017
Shanghai Challenger